Claude Lemaréchal is a French applied mathematician, and former senior researcher (directeur de recherche) at INRIA near Grenoble, France.

In mathematical optimization, Claude Lemaréchal is known for his work in numerical methods for  nonlinear optimization, especially for problems with nondifferentiable kinks. Lemaréchal and Philip Wolfe pioneered bundle methods of descent for convex minimization.

Awards 

In 1994, Claude Lemaréchal and Roger J-B Wets were each awarded the George B. Dantzig Prize. Recognizing "original research that has had a major impact on the field of mathematical programming", the Dantzig Prize is awarded by the Society for Industrial and Applied Mathematics (SIAM) and the Mathematical Programming Society (MPS).

Lagrangian duality and nonconvex primal problems

Soon after joining INRIA (then named "IRIA"), Lemaréchal had the assignment of helping a glass-manufacturer with a problem of scheduling its production, a problem whose first formulation required minimizing a non-convex function. For this non-convex minimization problem, Lemaréchal applied the theory of Lagrangian duality that was described in Lasdon's Optimization Theory for Large Systems. Because the primal problem was non-convex, there was no guarantee that a solution to the dual problem would provide useful information about the primal. Nonetheless, the dual problem did furnish useful information. Lemaréchal's success with Lagrangian dual methods on nonlinear programming problems with nonconvexities interested Ivar Ekeland and Jean–Pierre Aubin, who applied the Shapley–Folkman lemma to explain the Lemaréchal's success. The Aubin–Ekeland analysis of duality gaps  considered the convexclosure of a nonconvex minimization problem — that is, the problem defined by the closed convex hull of the epigraph of the original problem. Following Ekeland and Aubin, similar applications of the Shapley–Folkman lemma are described in optimization monographs and textbooks. These developments were catalyzed by Lemaréchal's demonstration that Lagrangian-dual methods were useful on some optimization problems that lacked convexity.

Bundle methods of descent

Lemaréchal's research also led to his work on (conjugate) subgradient methods and on bundle methods of descent for convex minimization problems.

Notes

Bibliography

Biographical

 Citation of Claude Lemaréchal for the George Dantzig Prize in 1994 in Optima, Issue 44 (1994) pages 4–5.

Scientific publications
 
 
 

 
 

Numerical analysts
Mathematical analysts
French operations researchers
Theoretical computer scientists
20th-century French mathematicians
21st-century French mathematicians
French computer scientists
Living people
Year of birth missing (living people)